Stormpolder is a polder and a hamlet in the Dutch province of South Holland. It is located about 7 km east of the center of Rotterdam, in the municipality of Krimpen aan den IJssel. It lies between the Nieuwe Maas and Hollandsche IJssel rivers.

Stormpolder was a separate municipality between 1817 and 1855, when it became part of Krimpen aan den IJssel.

References

Populated places in South Holland
Former municipalities of South Holland
Krimpen aan den IJssel